{{infobox television
| image              =
| caption            = 
| starring           = Keyshia ColeManny HalleyElite NoelNeffeteria PughFrankie LonsDaniel GibsonDaniel Gibson, Jr.
| opentheme          = "All In" byKeyshia Cole
| country            = United States
| num_seasons        = 1
| num_episodes       = 8
| executive_producer = 
| runtime            = 30 minutes
| company            = DuBose EntertainmentKeyshia Cole ProductionsBET Productions
| network            = BET
| first_aired        = 
| last_aired         = 
| related            = {{unbulleted list|Keyshia Cole: The Way It Is|Keyshia & Daniel: Family First|Frankie & Neffe|Keyshia Cole: My New Life}} 
}}Keyshia Cole: All In was a reality television series starring Grammy-nominated R&B singer Keyshia Cole. The series premiered on February 24, 2015, on BET as a follow-up to her 2012 reality television series, Keyshia & Daniel: Family First''.

Production
In July 2013, when Keyshia was asked if she would be bringing back her reality show for another season, she responded that she didn't know.

In the spring of 2014, it was disclosed that Keyshia was shooting a new season of reality television from day to day.

Premise
The show centers around Keyshia as she embarks on her Point of No Return Tour while coming to grips with the estrangement of her marriage and issues with her mother and sister while finishing her last album on Interscope Records.

Episodes

References

2010s American reality television series
2015 American television series debuts
Keyshia Cole
BET original programming
2015 American television series endings
American sequel television series